Protocol Composition Logic is a formal method that is used for proving security properties of protocols that use symmetric key and Public key cryptography. PCL is designed around a process calculi with actions for possible  protocol steps like  generating  some random number, perform encryption and decryption, send and receive messages and digital signature verification actions.

Some problems with the logic have been found implying that some currently claimed proofs cannot be proven within the logic.

References

Cryptography